Landeck Castle is a ruined hill castle southwest of Landau, near Klingenmünster in the county of Südliche Weinstraße in the German state of Rhineland-Palatinate.

Gallery

Literature 
 
 Alexander Thon, Hans Reither, Peter Pohlit: Burgruine Landeck. Schnell + Steiner, Regensburg 2005, .
 Alexander Thon (Hrsg.): ... wie eine gebannte, unnahbare Zauberburg. Burgen in der Südpfalz. 2., verb. Aufl. Schnell + Steiner, Regensburg 2005, S. 80–85, .
 Alexander Thon, „Es ist keine Kunde auf uns gekommen, von welchem Beherrscher des teutschen Reiches dieselbe erbaut worden sei …“. Anmerkungen zu Ermittlung und Bewertung der Ersterwähnung pfälzischer Burgen, in: Mythos Staufer – in memoriam Dankwart Leistikow – Akten der 5. Landauer Staufertagung 1.-3. Juli 2005, hrsg. v. Volker Herzner u. Jürgen Krüger, Speyer 2010, S. 127-139, hier S. 129f. (zu Ersterwähnung und Besitzverhältnissen).

External links 

 Eintrag zur Burg in der wissenschaftlichen Burgendatenbank des Europäischen Burgeninstituts (EBIDAT)
 Panoramablick von der Burg Landeck auf die Rheinebene und auf Klingenmünster
 Homepage der Burg Landeck
 Rekonstruktionszeichnung von Wolfgang Braun

Castles in Rhineland-Palatinate
Heritage sites in Rhineland-Palatinate